Lismore GAA is a Gaelic Athletic Association club based in Lismore, County Waterford, Ireland. The club enters teams in both GAA codes each year, which includes two adult hurling teams and one adult Gaelic football team in the Waterford County Championships. The club has won county titles in both Hurling and football, but in recent history the club has been mainly concerned with the game of hurling. The club's Camogie teams have also enjoyed much success.

The club has won the County Senior Hurling Championship 3 times, 1925(beating Erin's Own 4-2 to 2-3), the club had to wait 66 years before their next success in 1991(beating Mount Sion 5-7 to 1-5) and 1993(beating Passage 0-8 to 0-7). The following years proved somewhat frustrating for Lismore. Following much underage success through the 80's and 90's(including 10 western minor wins in a row), Lismore were expected to win a number county titles. However, Ballygunner and Mount Sion dominated the county scene in Waterford for a number of years with very strong teams. Despite having a depth of talent at their disposal, Lismore were unable to win another county title again in this period, going close on a number of occasions, most notably in the 1996, 2001 and 2009 county finals.

2016 saw Lismore finally win another county title, this time in the Intermediate grade. Following the disappointment of relegation from the senior ranks the previous year after 47 years as senior club, they won the Western Intermediate hurling final beating Modeligo 2-15 to 1-11. Dunhill were accounted for in the county final 5-19 to 1-7, with the Shanahan brothers, Maurice and Dan both rattling the net. Then the trip to play Cork champions Bandon saw the Lismore boys come out on top 2-20 to 1-12. Next up were Tipp side Newport and a close game was won 1-15 to 1-12.
A successful year was rounded off by being crowned Munster champions with victory over Kerry senior winners Kilmoyley 2-14 to 0-13. The team was captained by Paudie Prendergast.

Dan Shanahan
Maurice Shanahan
 Paudie Prendergast
 Sean Daly
 Dave Bennett
 James O'Connor
 Mark O'Sullivan
 Kieran O'Gorman
 Brendan Landers
 Barney Prendergast
 Ray Barry
 Sean Barry

Underage
For all underage competitions, up to Under-21, Lismore are amalgamated with Ballysaggart GAA.  The amalgamated team is known as St. Carthages.

Honours
Waterford Senior Hurling Championships: 3
 1925, 1991, 1993
Waterford Senior Football Championships: 4
 1899, 1901, 1902, 1911
Munster Intermediate Club Hurling Championships 1
 2016
Waterford Intermediate Hurling Championships: 2
 1969, 2016
 Waterford Intermediate Football Championships: 1
 2000
 Waterford Junior Hurling Championships: 7
 1924(?), 1936, 1938, 1940, 1967, 1999, 2006
 Waterford Junior Football Championships: 2
 1911, 1995
 Waterford Under-21 Hurling Championship 8
 1967, 1986, 1990, 1992, 1993, 1996, 1997, 1998
 Waterford Minor Hurling Championships: 8
 1935 (as St. Carthage's), 1939 (as St. Carthage's), 1985, 1987, 1988, 1990, 1995, 2011 (as St. Carthage's)

All Stars
 Dan Shanahan - 2004, 2006, 2007(Hurler of the Year)
 Maurice Shanahan - 2015

References

External sources

Gaelic games clubs in County Waterford
Hurling clubs in County Waterford
Gaelic football clubs in County Waterford
Lismore, County Waterford